The Chiemsee-Bahn is a meter gauge railway line in Prien am Chiemsee, Germany. It is one of the world's last steam tramways, and the oldest continuously operated steam tramway in regular operation.

Line
Its original terminus was on the west side of the main line railway tracks at Prien am Chiemsee station, which required the Chiemsee-Bahn to cross the tracks. This situation was eliminated in the winter of 1908/1909, when the Chiemsee-Bahn moved its terminus to the east side of the station. The line, along with its steam locomotive and passenger cars, is registered as a historic monument of Bavaria, numbered D-1-87-162-66.

History
After the death of King Ludwig II in 1886, his unfinished palace Herrenchiemsee was opened for visitors by his successor Luitpold, Prince Regent of Bavaria. Horse-drawn carriages transported the visitors from the railway station to the harbour, where they crossed over to the Herreninsel by boat. After an accident involving a horse-drawn carriage, Ludwig Feßler, operator of the Chiemsee-Schifffahrt, decided to contract Munich-based Krauss Locomotive Works with the planning for a local railway between Prien and Stock. The contract for the construction was signed on March 15, 1887. Construction began on May 2, and the line opened on July 9, 1887.

Rolling stock
The rolling stock consists of one steam engine and nine passenger cars, which still are in their original condition from 1887. Since 1982, the Chiemsee-Bahn also has a Deutz diesel engine, which was built in 1962 and was bought from the Halbergerhütte in Saarland.

References

External links

 

Transport in Bavaria
Metre gauge railways in Germany